Yordan Minchev (born 17 October 1998) is a Bulgarian professional basketball player for Rilski Sportist of the NBL.

Professional career
Minchev made his professional debut with Levski Sofia during the 2014–15 season of Bulgarian Basketball League and played in 5 games. Same season, he also played 5 times for the team in Adriatic League. During the 2015–16 season, he played 27 times in Bulgarian League and also played 14 times in Balkan League.

On November 2, 2016, Minchev signed a six-year (2+2+2) contract with Fenerbahçe.

On 13 February 2017, Minchev was loaned to a Serbian club Vršac for the rest of the 2016–17 season.

On October 1, 2017, Minchev was loaned to Macedonian club MZT Skopje for the 2017–18 season. On March 9, 2018, he left MZT Skopje. He finished the 2017–18 season playing with PBC Academic of the  Bulgarian NBL.

In October 2018, he joined the İstanbul BŞB.

On September 16, 2019, he has signed with Levski Lukoil of the NBL. 

On July 18, 2021, Minchev signed with OSE Lions of the Hungarian Nemzeti Bajnokság I/A.

In 2022, he returned for a third stint at Levski Sofia.

National team career
Minchev played with the junior national teams of Bulgaria. In 2017 he made his debut with the Bulgarian senior national team playing in the 2019 FIBA Basketball World Cup qualification.

Career statistics

EuroLeague

|-
| style="text-align:left;"| 2016–17
| style="text-align:left;" rowspan=1| Fenerbahçe
| 2 || 0 || 8.05 || .0 || .0 || .0 || 1 || 0 || 0 || 0 || 0 || -3
|-
|- class="sortbottom"
| align="center" colspan="2"| Career
| 0 || 0 || 0 || 0 || 0 || 0 || 0 || 0 || 0 || 0 || 0 || 0

See also 
 List of foreign basketball players in Serbia

References

External links
 Yordan Minchev at draftexpress.com
 Yordan Minchev at eurobasket.com
 Yordan Minchev at euroleague.net
 Yordan Minchev at fiba.com
 Yordan Minchev at realgm.com

1998 births
Living people
ABA League players
Basketball League of Serbia players
BC Levski Sofia players
Bulgarian expatriate basketball people in Serbia
Bulgarian expatriate basketball people in Turkey
Bulgarian men's basketball players
Fenerbahçe men's basketball players
İstanbul Büyükşehir Belediyespor basketball players
KK MZT Skopje players
KK Vršac players
PBC Academic players
Shooting guards
Small forwards
Sportspeople from Sliven